Techstars is a global investment business that provides access to capital, one-on-one mentorship, a worldwide network and customized programming for early-stage entrepreneurs. It was founded in 2006 in Boulder, Colorado. As of May 2022, the company had accepted over 2,900 companies into its accelerator programs with a combined market capitalization of $71bn USD.

History
Techstars was founded in Boulder, Colorado, by David Cohen, Brad Feld, David Brown, and Jared Polis in 2006. Initially, Techstars invested between $6,000 and $18,000 in early stage companies, providing entrepreneurs with mentorship during a three month accelerator program.

The company held its first program in Boulder in 2007 with ten companies. Of the ten, two were acquired that same year. As of 2012, three had achieved positive exits and two were generating millions in annual revenue. In subsequent years, Techstars expanded to Boston, Seattle, New York City, a "cloud" program in San Antonio, and Austin.

In January 2011, Techstars launched the Global Accelerator Network (GAN), which links 22 similar programs internationally. The network was launched in conjunction with President Barack Obama's Startup America Partnership. GAN is now an independently operated organization. Techstars has also supported the formation of Patriot Boot Camp.

In 2017, Techstars partnered with the venture capital firm Partech Ventures to expand its program to Paris, and in September of the same year was contracted to work with the United States Air Force's new technology accelerator AFwerX. At the beginning of 2019 Techstars started another European program around smart cities in Amsterdam with their corporate partner Arcadis.

In 2021 Techstars ran 47 accelerator programs in 33 cities and 12 countries around the world.

Structure
Startups can apply for Techstars' program and their viability is judged by the Managing Director of the program they applied to, as well as a screening committee composed of various members of the Techstars network.  In exchange for 6% common stock, each company accepted into Techstars currently receives $20,000 plus a $100,000 convertible note, access to the Techstars network for life, over $1M worth of perks (such as $25,000 to $100,000 in AWS credits), and a three-month accelerator program, which is conducted in three phases: mentorship, growth, and investment. On the last day, the 10-12 companies pitch publicly in front of investors, Techstars alumni, the local entrepreneur scene and corporate partners on the demo-day.

Notable alumni companies

 Bench
 Digital Ocean
FullContact
 Graphic.ly
 IntenseDebate
 Mocavo
 Murfie
 Next Big Sound
 Orbotix (Sphero)
Plated
Rheaply
 SendGrid
 Simple Energy
 Sketchfab
 Socialthing
 Zagster
 Lifebit

References

External links
 

2006 establishments in Colorado
Business incubators of the United States
Companies based in Boulder, Colorado
Financial services companies established in 2006
Investment companies of the United States
Mentorships
Startup accelerators
American companies established in 2006